Roger Marshall may refer to:

Roger Marshall (cricketer) (born 1952), English cricketer
Roger Marshall (politician) (born 1960), U.S. Senator from Kansas
Roger Marshall (screenwriter) (1934–2020), English screenwriter